The Shire of Rosenthal was a local government area south and west of the regional centre of Warwick in the Darling Downs region of Queensland.

History

The Inglewood Division was created on 11 November 1879 as one of 74 divisions around Queensland under the Divisional Boards Act 1879 with a population of 1378.
Following a petition by residents, the Rosenthal Division was created on 18 April 1889 under the Divisional Boards Act 1879 from Subdivision No. 1 of Inglewood Division.

With the passage of the Local Authorities Act 1902, Rosenthal Division became the Shire of Rosenthal on 31 March 1903. Its offices were located at Willi Street, Rosenthal Heights.

On 19 March 1992, the Electoral and Administrative Review Commission, created two years earlier, produced its report External Boundaries of Local Authorities, and recommended that local government boundaries in the Warwick area be rationalised into 3 new local government areas.  That recommendation was not implemented, but the outcome was that the Shire of Rosenthal was merged with the Shires of Allora and Glengallan and the City of Warwick to form a new Shire of Warwick. The Local Government (Allora, Glengallan, Rosenthal and Warwick) Regulation 1994 was gazetted on 20 May 1994. On 25 June, an election was held for the new council, and on 1 July 1994, the Shire of Rosenthal was abolished.

Towns and localities
The Shire of Rosenthal included the following settlements:

 Rosenthal Heights
 Allan
 Cunningham
 Dalveen
 Greymare
 Karara
 Leslie
 Leyburn
 Palgrave
 Pratten
 Rosehill
 Thane
 Wheatvale

Chairmen

 1927: J. A. Costello 
 1959: J. A. Costello

Population

References

External links
 Local Government (Allora, Glengallan, Rosenthal and Warwick) Regulation 1994

Former local government areas of Queensland
1886 establishments in Australia
1994 disestablishments in Australia